LCAW (Low Cost Anti-submarine Weapon) is a miniature torpedo developed by Whitehead Alenia Sistemi Subacquei S.p.A. (WASS).    LCAW is developed to fill the gap between conventional depth charge and torpedoes, in the area where depth charges lack propulsion and guidance, while the cost of expensive torpedoes is increasingly becoming prohibitive.  The program initially begun in 1987, and was completed in 1992.  In 1993, the program was adopted by Germany and Norway for their low cost anti-submarine weaponry program when the weaponry proved to meet the German and Norwegian requirement of maximum underwater attack range of 500 m from the point of entry into the water.  Norwegians subsequently developed their own upgraded variant.  In addition to regular deployment, LCAW is also used by Italian naval special forces.  The air-dropped version is deployed from aerial sonar buoy dispensers.  The weapon is primarily designed to engage targets in shallow water, especially midget submarines, swimmer delivery vehicle, human torpedo and other special operation users.

Variant
All of LCAW variants share the same operating depth, from 15 to 300 meters, and the same diameter, 123.8 mm.  The same 2.5 kg PBX shaped charge warhead is adopted by air-launched variants while a tandem charge is shared by surface-launched variants.  A total of five variants have been developed, including:
A200: The basic version with 883.4 mm, weighing 11.3 kg, with a range of 700 meters at 17 kt.  An improved version with 18 kt speed appeared later with either a range of 2 km or an endurance of 2 minutes.
A200/A: A 12 kg air-launched variant with air brake, with length increased to 914.4 cm.
A200/N: Norwegian variant with length greater than 2 meters, with vastly improved power plant which increased the range to a maximum of 8 km, with a 70% to 85% probability of hitting the hostile submarine traveling at 8 knots.
A202: a 16 kg variant for frogmen use, launched from a Bazooka-like launcher called Medusa, first adopted by Italian naval special force.

Operators

References
LCAW @ Jane's

Torpedoes